Following is a list of notable people who were born in, raised in, or have lived for a significant period of time in the U.S. state of Nevada.

Political figures

Mark Amodei (born 1958) – U.S. Representative for Nevada's 2nd congressional district
Kathy Augustine (1956–2006) – Nevada State Controller (from 1999 until her death) 
Walter Baring (1911–1975) – member of the U.S. House of Representatives from Nevada's At-Large district
Helen Delich Bentley – former Republican member of the U.S. House of Representatives
Alan Bible (1909–1988) – former Democratic U S Senator from Nevada
James Bilbray – Nevada's first district, U.S. House of Representatives
Emmet D. Boyle – first Nevada-born governor of Nevada
Berkeley L. Bunker (1906–1999) – U.S. Senator from Nevada and member of the U.S. House of Representatives
Howard Cannon (1912–2002) – former Democratic U S Senator from Nevada
Catherine Cortez Masto (born 1964) – U.S. Senator from Nevada (since 2017)
Jim Gibbons (born 1944) – 28th Governor of Nevada
Carolyn Goodman – Mayor of Las Vegas (since 2012)
Oscar Goodman – Mayor of Las Vegas (2002–2012)
Morley Griswold (1890–1951) – served in the U.S. Army in World War I; later became lieutenant governor of Nevada, and later Governor of Nevada
Martin Heinrich (born 1971) – U.S. Senator from New Mexico (since 2013)
Dean Heller – U.S. Senator and former U.S. Congressman from Nevada's 2nd congressional district 
Steven Horsford (born 1973) – U.S. Representative for Nevada's 4th congressional district
Velma Bronn Johnston (1912–1977) – animal-rights activist
Ruben Kihuen (born 1980) – former U.S. Representative for Nevada's 4th congressional district 
Paul Laxalt – Republican Governor of Nevada and U.S. Senator from Nevada
Myron E. Leavitt (1930–2004) – former Lieutenant Governor of Nevada
Pat McCarran (1876–1954) – former United States Senator from Nevada; namesake of McCarran International Airport
Mike McGinness – Republican member of the Nevada Senate
Pat Nixon (1912–1993) – First Lady of the United States (1969–1974)
Key Pittman (1872–1940) – former Democratic U S Senator from Nevada; President pro tempore and Chairman Committee on Foreign Relations
Vail M. Pittman (1880–1964) – 19th Governor of Nevada and 19th Lieutenant Governor of Nevada
Harry Reid (1939–2021) – United States Senate Minority Leader (since 2005)
Marco Rubio (born 1971) – U.S. Senator from Florida (Since 2011)
James David Santini (1937–2015) – U.S. Representative from Nevada's At-Large district
Grant Sawyer (1918–1996) – 21st Governor of Nevada; formed Nevada Gaming Commission
W. Frank Stewart – silver miner in Virginia City; Democratic state senator for Storey County, 1876-1880
Jon Wellinghoff (born 1949) – attorney, energy expert, and chairman of the Federal Energy Regulatory Commission

News media

Newspaper, radio, and television

Art Bell – syndicated radio host
A.E. Cahlan (1899–1968) – Las Vegas Review-Journal owner and publisher
Norm Clarke – gossip columnist, Las Vegas Review-Journal
Hank Greenspun (1909–1989) – Las Vegas Sun newspaper publisher
Kimberly Pressler (born 1977) – sports reporter, former Miss USA

Sportspeople

A–G

Andre Agassi – Hall of Fame professional tennis player
Greg Anthony – NBA player and broadcaster
Luke Babbitt – small forward for the Portland Trail Blazers
Ryan Bader – professional mixed martial artist with the UFC
Shannon Bahrke – Olympic freestyle skier
Marcus Banks – point guard for the New Orleans Hornets
Craig Barlow – professional golfer
Dusty Bergman – former pitcher for the Anaheim Angels
Tyler Bey (born 1998) - basketball player in the Israeli Basketball Premier League
Rocky Biddle – former MLB pitcher
Erica Blasberg (1984–2010) – LPGA golfer
Michael Blazek – pitcher for the Milwaukee Brewers
Avery Bradley – player for the Detroit Pistons
Kris Bryant – player for the Chicago Cubs
Kurt Busch – NASCAR driver
Kyle Busch – NASCAR driver
Billy Campfield – former NFL running back
Gina Carano – MMA fighter
Glenn Carano – former Dallas Cowboys quarterback
Chris Carr – former NFL player
Chris Carter – player for the Houston Astros
Spencer Clark (1987–2006) – NASCAR driver
Rico Constantino – professional wrestler
Austin Corbett – football player
Marty Cordova – Major League Baseball left fielder
Scott Cousins – former MLB outfielder
Mike Crawford – NFL linebacker
Harvey Dahl – offensive guard for the Atlanta Falcons
Brian Dallimore – former infielder for the San Francisco Giants
Ted Davidson – MLB relief pitcher
Diana Davis – American-Russian ice dancer
Ricky Davis – professional basketball player in the NBA
Wheezer Dell – MLB pitcher
Brandyn Dombrowski – offensive tackle for the San Diego Chargers
Marion Jones Farquhar – Hall of Fame tennis player
Joey Gallo – player for the Texas Rangers
Brendan Gaughan – NASCAR driver
Joey Gilbert –  boxer, lawyer, sports agent
Nate Grimes (born 1996) - basketball player in the Israeli Basketball Premier League
Lawrence Guy – defensive end for the New England Patriots

H–M

Ray Handley – former football player; New York Giants head coach
Bryce Harper – Major League Baseball player 
Carey Hart – freestyle motocross racer, pro BMX rider
Will Hernandez – guard for the New York Giants
Pierre Jackson (born 1991) – basketball player
Steven Jackson – professional football player
Ben Jacobs – professional football player
Nick Johnson – professional basketball player in the NBA
Colin Kaepernick – professional football player
Keith Kartz – former player for the Denver Broncos
Klete Keller – Olympic swimmer
Brian Kelly – former NFL cornerback
Brandon Kintzler – pitcher for the Minnesota Twins
Jack Kramer – Hall of Fame tennis player
Iris Kyle – ten-time overall Ms. Olympia professional bodybuilder
Joseph Lang (1911–1990) – boxer
T.J. Lavin – professional BMX rider and musician
Steven Lerud – former catcher for the Philadelphia Phillies
Ryan Ludwick – right fielder for the Cincinnati Reds
Greg Maddux – Major League Baseball player
Julia Mancuso – Olympic alpine ski racer, gold and silver medalist
Brandon Marshall – professional football player
Josh Mauga – professional football player
Lucas May – former catcher for the Kansas City Royals
Floyd Mayweather Jr. – boxer
Jake McGee – relief pitcher for the Tampa Bay Rays
Maurice E. McLoughlin – Hall of Fame tennis player
Randy Messenger – former MLB pitcher
Frank Mir – mixed martial artist; former UFC champion
DeMarco Murray – running back for the Philadelphia Eagles

N–Z

Roy Nelson – mixed martial artist 
Tommy Pham – outfielder for the Tampa Bay Rays
Amy Purdy – snowboarder
Donn Roach – MLB pitcher
Drew Robinson – utility player for the Texas Rangers
Rolando Romero – professional boxer
Grey Ruegamer – professional football player in the NFL
Ryback – professional wrestler
Eric Sanders – former NFL player
Nate Schierholtz – outfielder for the Washington Nationals
Tasha Schwikert – gymnast, 2003 gold medalist
Adam Seward – professional football player in the NFL
Chasen Shreve – relief pitcher for the St. Louis Cardinals
Matt Smith – former MLB pitcher
Scott Smith – mixed martial artist
Brandon Snyder – first baseman for the Boston Red Sox
Ronnie Stanley – NFL offensive tackle
Stevenson Sylvester – linebacker for the Pittsburgh Steelers
TaShawn Thomas (born 1993) – basketball player in the Israeli Premier League
Brad Thompson – former MLB pitcher
Korey Toomer – linebacker for the Dallas Cowboys
Joe Valentine – former relief pitcher for the Cincinnati Reds
Kyle Van Noy – linebacker for the New England Patriots
Byron Velvick – professional bass fisherman
Tyler Wagner – pitcher for the Arizona Diamondbacks
H Waldman (born 1972) – American-Israeli basketball player
C. J. Watson – professional basketball player
Joe Wieland – MLB pitcher
Duke Williams – professional football player in the NFL
Matt Williams – Major League Baseball third baseman and manager
Aarik Wilson – long jumper
Charles Wright – professional wrestler
Barry Zito – Major League Baseball starting pitcher
Jason Zucker – NHL hockey player

Entertainment

Actors

A–M

Ben Alexander (1911–1969) – actor
Mädchen Amick (born 1970) – actress, Shelly Johnson on Twin Peaks
Jaylen Barron (born 1997) – actress
Toni Basil (born 1943) – singer-songwriter, actress
Deanna Brooks (born 1974) – actress, model
Reno Browne (1921–1991) – film actress, equestrian, pilot
Charisma Carpenter (born 1970) – actress, Cordelia Chase on Buffy the Vampire Slayer and Angel
Dillon Casey (born 1983) – actor
Hobart Cavanaugh (1886–1950) – actor
Daveigh Chase (born 1990) – actress, singer, Rhonda Volmer on Big Love
Tishara Cousino (born 1978) – model, actress, real estate broker
Abby Dalton (1932–2020) – actress
Gabriel Damon (born 1976) – actor
Misty Dawn (born 1963) – adult film actress
Doris Dawson (1909–1986) – silent film actress
Loren Dean (born 1969) – actor, Enemy of the State, Apollo 13, Mumford
Thomas Dekker (born 1987) – actor, musician, John Connor on Terminator: The Sarah Connor Chronicles
Brad Dexter (1917–2002) – actor, The Magnificent Seven
Leah Dizon (born 1986) – model, singer, Japanese television personality
Chase Ellison (born 1993) – actor
Kathy Evison (born 1963) – actress, Lonnie Henderson on SeaQuest DSV
Joe Flanigan (born 1967) – actor, Major/Lt. Colonel John Sheppard on Stargate Atlantis
Michele Greene (born 1962) – actress, singer, and songwriter
Matthew Gray Gubler (born 1980) – actor, director, Dr. Spencer Reid on Criminal Minds
Corinna Harney (born 1972) – model, actress, 1992 Playboy Playmate of the Year
Veronica Hart (born 1956) – 1980s adult film actress
Annette Haven (born 1954) – 1970s and 1980s adult film actress
Adam Hicks (born 1992) – actor, singer, dancer
Jenna Jameson (born 1974) – adult film actress and entertainer
Bryce Johnson (born 1977) – actor, Josh Ford on Popular
Rebekah Kochan (born 1984) – actress
Michelle Krusiec (born 1974) – actress, One World
Joseph D. Kucan (born 1965) – video game developer, director, actor, screenwriter
Jennifer Lyon (1972–2010) – actress, competitor on Survivor: Palau
Jena Malone (born 1984) – actress, musician, photographer
Lily Mariye (born 1964) – actress, Lily Jarvik on ER
Meaghan Jette Martin (born 1992) – actress, singer, musician
Peyton Meyer (born 1998) – actor

N–Z

Lycia Naff (born 1962) – actress, Ensign Sonya Gomez on Star Trek: The Next Generation
Thomas Ian Nicholas (born 1980) – actor, the American Pie films
Sean Palmer (born 1973) – actor, singer, dancer
Mr. Pete (born 1980) – adult film actor and director
Sasha Pieterse (born 1996) – teen actress, Alison DiLaurentis on Pretty Little Liars
Kristoffer Polaha (born 1977) – actor
Edna Purviance (1895–1958) – actress
Amanda Righetti (born 1983) – actress, Grace Van Pelt on The Mentalist
Stephanie Romanov (born 1969) – actress, model, Lilah Morgan on Angel
Paul Schrier (born 1970) – actor, Bulk on Mighty Morphin Power Rangers
Jason-Shane Scott (born 1976) – actor
Dana Snyder (born 1973) – stand-up comedian, actor, voice artist, Master Shake on Aqua Teen Hunger Force
Shannyn Sossamon (born 1978) – actress, dancer, model, musician
Bobby Tonelli (born 1975) – actor
Cerina Vincent (born 1979) – actress, model, Maya on Power Rangers Lost Galaxy
Carrie Clark Ward (1862–1926) – silent film actress
Dawn Wells (1938–2020) – actress, business owner, Mary Ann on Gilligan's Island
Rutina Wesley – actress, Tara Thornton on True Blood
Lauren Woodland (born 1977) – actress, Brittany Marsino on The Young and the Restless

Music

Vernon Alley – jazz bassist
Cosmo Baker – New York-based DJ, music producer
Joyce Collins – jazz pianist, singer
Rick DeJesus – lead vocals for band Adelitas Way
Daniel de los Reyes – percussionist 
Dino – DJ, singer-songwriter and record producer
Leah Dizon – gaijin tarento, singer, and gravure idol in Japan
Julie Elias – Christian musician
Brandon Flowers – lead singer of The Killers
Dia Frampton – indie rock and pop singer
Tony Fredianelli – alternative rock musician, formerly with Third Eye Blind
Nicholas Furlong – singer, songwriter, producer
Mikalah Gordon – singer, American Idol finalist
Max Green – musician, co-founder of punk rock band, Escape the Fate
Eric Hester – film and TV composer
Nikki Holland – singer-songwriter
Antonia Iacobescu – singer, performer, and model
JGivens – Christian hip hop musician
Chris Jones – guitarist
Kaya Jones – pop singer, formerly with The Pussycat Dolls
Brian Landrus – jazz saxophonist
Jenny Lewis – singer
Jenny Lee Lindberg – bassist for indie band, Warpaint
Lorie Line – classically trained pianist, composer
Manika – singer
Tommy Marth – saxophone player
Justin McBride – country music singer
Waddie Mitchell – cowboy poet
Nikki Nelson – country music singer
Ne-Yo – R&B singer, songwriter
Sunny Ozell – singer-songwriter
Louis Prima Jr – singer, entertainer, trumpeter, and bandleader
Ronnie Radke – lead singer for Falling in Reverse
Dan Reynolds – frontman for Imagine Dragons
Barbara Robison – lead vocalist for The Peanut Butter Conspiracy
Jim Root – rhythm guitarist for Slipknot
Ryan Ross – former lead guitarist, lyricist for Panic! at the Disco
Chuck Ruff – rock drummer
Lee Scrivner – songwriter
Kevin Seconds – vocalist, songwriter, musician
Shamir – singer-songwriter 
Billy Sherwood – progressive rock musician, record producer, and engineer
Mark Slaughter – singer and musician, founder of the hard rock band Slaughter 
Spencer Smith – drummer for Panic! at the Disco
Gavin Templeton – modern jazz saxophonist
Lynn Truell – drummer for Imperial Teen
Brendon Urie – lead singer for Panic! at the Disco
Ronnie Vannucci Jr. – drummer for The Killers
Willy Vlautin – lead singer for Richmond Fontaine
Eric Whitacre – composer and conductor
Whitton – singer-songwriter 
David Yow – lead vocalist for Scratch Acid and The Jesus Lizard
Dolora Zajick – mezzo-soprano
Asaiah Ziv – hip hop musician

Film, stage, television and sound production

Joe Ansolabehere – animation screenwriter and producer
Glen Charles – Emmy Award-winning television writer
Les Charles – Emmy Award-winning television writer
C. Jay Cox (born 1962) – director, screenwriter
Curtis Hanson – Academy Award-winning filmmaker
Thomas N. Heffron – screenwriter, director

Authors

Alta – poet, prose writer and publisher
Nevada Barr – author of mystery novels
Susan Berman – journalist, daughter of "Davie the Jew" Berman
Charles Bock – novelist
Juanita Brooks – author and historian
Walter van Tilburg Clark – writer
Cecelia Holland – historical novelist
Robert Laxalt – writer
Adrian C. Louis – author and poet
James Marshall – children's author and illustrator
Lloyd Osbourne – novelist
Lute Pease – journalist and cartoonist
Sheldon Rampton – editor of PR Watch and author of books on the public relations industry
Geoff Schumacher – journalist and author
Harry Shannon – novelist
David Derek Stacton (1925–1968) – author and poet
Richard Walton Tully – playwright
Dave Ulrich – author of books on leadership and human resources
Claire Vaye Watkins – author of the book Battleborn
Sarah Winnemucca – Northern Paiute author, activist and educator

Miscellaneous

Jennifer Allan – model
Robert Bigelow – businessman
James E. Casey (1888–1983) – founder, United Parcel Service (UPS)
Arianny Celeste – model8
Chumlee – businessman
Kimberley Conrad – model and former wife of Hugh Hefner
Laura Dahl – fashion designer
Milton H. Erickson – psychiatrist specializing in medical hypnosis and family therapy
George Ferris Jr. – engineer, creator of the Ferris Wheel
Lorenzo Fertitta – Italian-American entrepreneur, investor and philanthropist
Sean Hamilton – radio personality
Jennifer Harman – professional poker player
Corey Harrison  – businessman
Chelsie Hightower (born 1989) – Latin ballroom dancer, Dancing with the Stars
David Huntsberger (born 1980) – comedian, co-host of the Professor Blastoff podcast
Jimmy Kimmel

 – talk show host and comedian 
Dat So La Lee (1829–1925) – basket weaver
Jennifer Mabus – YouTuber, hiker, Navy spouse
Tony Mendez (1940–2019) – CIA technical operations officer
Tana Mongeau – internet personality 
Jessica Nigri – cosplay celebrity, promotional model, YouTuber, voice actress, and fan convention interview correspondent 
Pierre Omidyar – billionaire founder of eBay
Angel Porrino – TV personality, showgirl, Holly's World
Kevin Rose – Internet entrepreneur
Bob Tallman – news announcer
J. Buzz Von Ornsteiner – psychologist and television personality
Wovoka – Paiute religious leader
Steve Wynn – casino tycoon; owner of Wynn Resorts Limited
Shane Dale Professional Gambler

See also

 List of Nevada suffragists
Lists of Americans

References